Berthold or Berchtold is a Germanic given name and surname. It is derived from two elements, berht meaning "bright" and wald meaning "(to) rule". It may refer to:
Bertholdt Hoover, a fictional character in the anime/manga series Attack on Titan

People with the given name Berthold
Berthold, Duke of Bavaria, (900–947), German duke
Berthold, Margrave of Baden (1906-1963), German aristocrat 
Berthold of Garsten (died 1142), Austrian prelate
Berthold of Parma (died 1111), Italian Benedictine lay brother and saint
Berthold (patriarch of Aquileia) (1180–1251), Hungarian archbishop and patriarch
Berthold of Ratisbon (1210–1272), German monk
Berthold Auerbach (1812–1882), German-Jewish poet and author
Bertolt Brecht (1898–1956), German dramatist
Berthold Englisch (1851-1897), Austrian-Jewish chess master
Berthold Laufer (1874-1934), German anthropologist and historical geographer with an expertise in East Asian languages
Berthold Lubetkin (1901—1990), Russian architect
Berthold Schenk Graf von Stauffenberg (1905—1944), German aristocrat and lawyer
Berthold Schwarz, semi-legendary inventor of gunpowder
Berthold Viertel (1953-1953), Austrian screenwriter and film director
Berthold IV, Duke of Zähringen (1125–1186)

People with the surname Berthold
Arnold Adolph Berthold (1803-1861), German physiologist and zoologist
Avgust Berthold (1880–1919), Slovene photographer
David Berthold, Australian theatre director
Joseph Berchtold, early senior Nazi Party member and a co-founder of both the Sturmabteilung (SA) and Schutzstaffel (SS)
Rudolph Berthold (1891–1920), German WWI flying ace
Thomas Berthold (born 1964), soccer coach
Richard Berthold (born 1946), American professor of history (retired)

Companies
Berthold Type Foundry, former German type foundry

Places 
 Berthold, North Dakota, United States

See also
 Berthod, a surname

Surnames from given names